Losing Isaiah is a 1995 American drama film starring Jessica Lange and Halle Berry, directed by Stephen Gyllenhaal. It is based on the novel of the same name by Seth Margolis. The screenplay is written by Naomi Foner Gyllenhaal. The original music score is composed by Mark Isham.

Plot
While craving her next hit, Khaila Richards (Halle Berry), an African-American crack cocaine addict, abandons her infant illegitimate son, Isaiah, in the dumpster. She promises to "come back later", but then passes out from the drugs. The next day, the infant narrowly escapes death in the garbage truck. Baby Isaiah is sent to the hospital, where they discover he is also addicted to crack through his mother's addiction. While caring for Isaiah, a social worker named Margaret Lewin (Jessica Lange) grows increasingly fond of him and eventually adopts him to live with her and her husband, Charles (David Strathairn) and daughter, Hannah. Meanwhile, Khaila is caught shoplifting and is sent to rehab, unaware Isaiah is alive.

Three years later, Khaila successfully completes her treatment and confesses to her case worker that she abandoned Isaiah in the alley. Unknown to Khaila, the case worker investigates and discovers Isaiah's adoption. They hire a lawyer, Kadar Lewis (Samuel L. Jackson) to contest the adoption. An ugly court battle ensues, with racial issues demonstrating inadequacies on both sides. The judge overturns the adoption, returning Isaiah to Khaila, much to the Lewins' horror and sadness.

Even after weeks pass, a distraught Isaiah does not consider Khaila his mother. Although he becomes increasingly withdrawn, he is also prone to violent public outbursts. Eventually, Khaila is desperate for Isaiah's happiness, and asks Margaret to step back in "for a little while... until he can understand." However, she insists she will also continue to be involved. The two mothers embrace each other, both proclaiming their equally strong motherly love for Isaiah. The two mothers then begin together playing building blocks with their beloved boy in a classroom.

Cast
Jessica Lange as Margaret Lewin
Halle Berry as Khaila Richards
David Strathairn as Charles Lewin
Cuba Gooding Jr. as Eddie Hughes
Samuel L. Jackson as Kadar Lewis
Daisy Eagan as Hannah Lewin
Marc John Jefferies as Isaiah
Joie Lee as Marie
Regina Taylor as Gussie
LaTanya Richardson as Caroline Jones
Jacqueline Brookes as Judge Silbowitz
Deanna Dunagan as Dr. Goldstein

Reception
Losing Isaiah received mostly negative reviews from critics.
 
It has a 45% rating on Rotten Tomatoes based on 29 reviews.

References

External links
 
 
 
 

1995 films
1995 drama films
Films about race and ethnicity
Films based on American novels
Films directed by Stephen Gyllenhaal
Films set in Chicago
Films shot in Chicago
Paramount Pictures films
Films about adoption
Films scored by Mark Isham
African-American drama films
African-American films
Films about mother–son relationships
1990s English-language films
1990s American films